Dennis Sepp (born 7 June 1973) is a Dutch former professional footballer who played for HSC '21, SC Enschede and Excelsior '31 in the Netherlands, as well as for Bradford City in England.

External links

Player profile at Dutch Players Abroad

1973 births
Living people
Sportspeople from Apeldoorn
Association football forwards
Dutch footballers
Bradford City A.F.C. players
Dutch expatriate footballers
Expatriate footballers in England
English Football League players
HSC '21 players
Dutch expatriate sportspeople in England
Footballers from Gelderland